Charlie Wyse (born September 12, 1946) is an educator and former Canadian politician, who was a New Democratic Member of the Legislative Assembly in British Columbia from 2005 to 2009. He represented the riding of Cariboo South.

Wyse, a teacher until 2004, served 23 years as a member of the city council for Williams Lake.

He ran in the newly created riding of Cariboo-Chilcotin for the 2009 election. He was initially declared the winner on election night, but was subsequently declared defeated by BC Liberal challenger Donna Barnett after a recount.

Electoral record

References

British Columbia New Democratic Party MLAs
Living people
1940s births
21st-century Canadian politicians